Elizabeth Brown may refer to:

 Elizabeth Martha Brown (1811–1856), last woman to be hanged in public in Dorset, England
 Elizabeth Brown (astronomer) (1830–1899), English astronomer
 Elizabeth Brown (musician) (born 1953), American contemporary composer and musical performer
 Elizabeth Mills Brown (1916–2008), American architectural historian, preservationist, and civic leader
 Elizabeth Ann Brown (1918–2017), American foreign service officer
 Elizabeth A. R. Brown (born 1932), American professor of history at Brooklyn College, City University of New York
 Elizabeth Brown (botanist) (1956–2013), New Zealand-born botanist
 Elizabeth Brown, American politician in the Columbus, Ohio City Council
 Liz Brown (politician), American politician first elected to the Indiana Senate in 2014
 Liz Brown, backing vocalist for Wheatus

See also
 Elizabeth Browne (disambiguation)